Zealandia pustulata, synonym Microsorum pustulatum, (kangaroo fern or hound's tongue, in Māori: kōwaowao, pāraharaha) is a species of fern within the family Polypodiaceae.

Distribution
This species occurs widely in New Zealand and also in Queensland, New South Wales, Victoria and Tasmania in Australia. An example occurrence in the North Island of New Zealand is in the Hamilton Ecological District where it is associated with a number of other ferns including Icarus filiforme and Lomaria discolor.

See also
Phlebodium aureum, similar looking fern
Microsorum punctatum, another similar looking species

Notes

References
 C. Michael Hogan. 2009. Crown Fern: Blechnum discolor, Globaltwitcher.com, ed. N. Stromberg
 D.J. Mabberley. 2008. Mabberley's plant-book: a portable dictionary of plants, their classification and uses, third edition, revised, Cambridge University Press, 1021 pages

 Polypodium pustulatum G.Forst., Fl. Ins. Austr. 81 (1786).
  
  pdf

Polypodiaceae
Ferns of New Zealand
Flora of New South Wales
Flora of Queensland
Flora of Victoria (Australia)
Flora of Tasmania
Ferns of Australia